Hassan Al-Qayd (born 13 April 1998) is a Saudi Arabian professional footballer who currently plays as a winger for Abha.

Career statistics

Club

References

External links
 

1998 births
Living people
People from Jizan Province
Association football wingers
Saudi Arabian footballers
Al-Shabab FC (Riyadh) players
Khaleej FC players
Abha Club players
Al-Ahli Saudi FC players
Place of birth missing (living people)
Saudi Professional League players
Saudi First Division League players